Maggie Beer  (born Margaret Anne Ackerman, 19 January 1945) is an Australian chef, food author, restaurateur, and food manufacturer. Beer is one of the judges on The Great Australian Bake Off alongside Matt Moran and is also a regular guest on MasterChef Australia.

Early life
Maggie Beer was born in Sydney in January 1945, to Ronald Ackerman, whose German ancestry was from his paternal grandparents, and Doreen Carter, who had English ancestry from her maternal great-grandparents. Her father's ancestors lived in Hill End located in regional New South Wales and were gold miners. Beer believed they were Jewish, but this was refuted in an episode of Who Do You Think You Are?, as it emerged that her ancestors had been Catholic for as long as there were records.

She grew up with her family in Sydney's western suburbs. Beer's parents faced issues with bankruptcy as she was growing up and re-invented themselves as caterers. She stated this contributed to her strong work ethic later in life. Beer did not complete her high school education, instead choosing to leave school to help the family at the age of 14 and worked in various jobs, including one as a lift operator in a New Zealand department store and an assistant to a senior geophysicist for British Petroleum in Libya before returning to Sydney in 1968. Beer has traced her passion for food to her childhood: "Food was vital; there was a real interest in food and its quality and an obsession with freshness. Cooking was just accepted, it was part of the norm."

Career
Despite not having any formal training as a chef, Beer has accumulated a triumphant career spanning almost five decades. Her only paid cooking job was at a Scottish sailing school during a European trip in her early twenties. She stated: "I used the whole of their larder for the four-month season in eight weeks because I'm a very generous cook, that's the only way I know how to cook". After relocating from Sydney to the Barossa Valley, Maggie and her husband Colin established the Farm Shop in 1979 which morphed into the Barossa Pheasant Farm Restaurant later that year. The restaurant became known for serving locally sourced pheasant as well as a pâté, known as Pheasant Farm Pate. In 1991 the restaurant was awarded the Remy Martin Cognac – Australian Gourmet Traveller Restaurant of the Year award. Maggie and Colin operated the hugely successful restaurant until 1993. Later, she became a partner in the Charlick's Feed Store restaurant in Ebenezer Place, located in the Adelaide city centre.

Currently, Beer operates a business in the Barossa which produces a range of gourmet foods, including Pheasant Farm Pate, quince paste, verjuice and gourmet ice creams. She co-hosted the ABC television cooking program The Cook and the Chef with Simon Bryant, who is the Head Chef for the Hilton, Adelaide. She has also appeared several times as a guest judge and guest masterclass presenter on MasterChef Australia.

Beer has written books about food and food preparation, as well as co-authoring a book with noted cook, restaurateur and food writer Stephanie Alexander. One of her co-written books, Stephanie Alexander and Maggie Beer's Tuscan Cook, has been translated into five different languages. In 2012 she participated in Who Do You Think You Are, a show which uncovered a convicted bigamist in her family history.

In April 2015, Beer and Matt Moran were announced as the judges of the second season of The Great Australian Bake Off, which aired on LifeStyle Food from 13 October 2015.

Honours
In 1997, Beer was the Telstra South Australian Business Woman of the Year.

Beer was awarded the Centenary Medal on 1 January 2001 for service to Australian society through cooking and writing.

In 2008, Maggie Beer won the Australian Publishers Association's illustrated Book of the Year for Maggie's Harvest.

She was awarded the "Senior Australian of the Year" 2010. In the same year she presented the Dymphna Clark Memorial Lecture.

In the Australia Day Honours of 2012, Maggie Beer was appointed a Member of the Order of Australia (AM), "for service to the tourism and hospitality industries as a cook, restaurateur and author, and to the promotion of Australian produce and cuisine".

In April 2016, Beer was awarded an honorary doctorate from the University of South Australia in recognition of her achievements in tourism and hospitality, and to the promotion of Australian produce and cuisine.

In 2022, Beer was promoted to Officer of the Order of Australia (AO) in the 2022 Australia Day Honours for "distinguished service to the tourism and hospitality industries as a cook, restaurateur and author, and to aged welfare".

Personal life
She married Colin Beer on 17 January 1970 and they own a cottage home in the Barossa Valley in South Australia. She has two daughters. Her eldest daughter died suddenly on 14 February 2020, aged 46.

Works
Cooking With Verjuice
Stephanie Alexander and Maggie Beer's Tuscan Cookbook
Maggie's Table
Maggie's Harvest
Maggie's Kitchen
Maggie's Orchard
Maggie's Christmas
Maggie's Farm
Maggie's Verjuice Cookbook
Winter Harvest
Maggie's Recipe For Life

See also
 South Australian food and drink

References

External links
 Maggie Beer's website
 ABC profile
 ABC TV: The Cook and the Chef
 Maggie Beer discussing her recent book, Maggie's Harvest at the State library of Queensland
 Video of Maggie Beer discussing Maggie's Harvest from Penguin Group (Australia)

Food and drink companies of Australia
People from South Australia
Australian food writers
Women food writers
Women cookbook writers
Australian television chefs
Living people
1945 births
Recipients of the Centenary Medal
Barossa Valley
Officers of the Order of Australia
People from Sydney
Australian people of German descent
Australian people of English descent
Australian women in business
Women chefs